Marjoe is a 1972 American documentary film produced and directed by Howard Smith and Sarah Kernochan about the life of evangelist Marjoe Gortner. It won the 1972 Academy Award for Best Documentary Feature.

Story
Marjoe Gortner was a precocious child preacher with extraordinary talents, who was immensely popular in the American South. His parents earned large sums of money off of his earnings until the point he outgrew the novelty of his youthfulness.

Gortner rejoined the ministry as a young adult solely as a means of earning a living, not as a believer. He spent the next several years using his fame and status as an evangelist to earn a living from both tent revivals and televangelism. Eventually, Gortner suffered a crisis of conscience of sorts and decided to give up the revival circuit, but not any of the money he made from it. He offered a documentary film crew unrestricted access to him during his final revival tour, which took place in 1971.

The film contains scenes from revival meetings showing Gortner preaching and praying for people in Los Angeles, Fort Worth, Detroit, and Anaheim. This is interspersed with footage of Gortner admitting on camera that he was a non-believer and revealing the tactics that he and other evangelists used to manipulate people and to move them during revivals. Some of the evangelists even revealed where they bought properties kept secret and gave him advice to follow. Gortner said he studied Mick Jagger of the Rolling Stones, as a model for his routine.

Release 
At the time of the film's release, it generated considerable press, but the movie was not shown widely in theaters in the Southern United States. The distributor feared adverse reaction to the film in the Bible Belt.

Soundtrack
A soundtrack was released by Warner Bros. Records, consisting of sermons and spoken word segments by Marjoe (from age four), intermixed with songs. "Save All My Brothers", the film's theme song, was written by Sarah Kernochan and Joseph Brooks, who also arranged it, and it was sung by Jerry Keller.

Rediscovery and re-release
Although released on VHS, the film had long been out of print and had deteriorated. In 2002 the negative and other elements were found in a vault in New York City.  The Academy Film Archive preserved Marjoe in 2005. On November 15, 2005, in New York City, the IFC Center showed Marjoe as the closing film in a series of documentaries called "Stranger Than Fiction". The restored film has since been released on DVD and streaming services.

Awards 
The film won the 1972 Academy Award for Best Documentary Feature.

See also
 List of American films of 1972
Jesus Camp
List of rediscovered films

References

External links

Marjoe review by Richard Brody at The New Yorker

1972 films
1972 documentary films
American documentary films
Best Documentary Feature Academy Award winners
Documentary films about Christianity in the United States
Documentary films critical of Christianity
Films critical of religion
Films about evangelicalism
Films directed by Howard Smith
Films directed by Sarah Kernochan
Films shot in California
Films shot in Texas
Films shot in Michigan
1970s rediscovered films
Rediscovered American films
1972 directorial debut films
1970s English-language films
1970s American films